Mount Russell is a mountain on Vancouver Island, British Columbia, Canada, located  northeast of Woss and  southwest of Mount Palmerston. It lies in the east headwaters of Tsitika River.

See also
 Geography of British Columbia

References

One-thousanders of British Columbia
Vancouver Island Ranges
Rupert Land District